Jayne Mansfield's Pink Palace was a mansion bought and refurbished with pink paint and fixtures by American actress Jayne Mansfield in 1957. The mansion was demolished in 2002.

History
In November 1957, shortly before her marriage to Mickey Hargitay, Mansfield bought a 40-room Mediterranean-style mansion formerly owned by Rudy Vallée at 10100 Sunset Boulevard in Holmby Hills, Los Angeles. Much of the investment to buy the house came from the $81,340 ($ in  dollars) she inherited from her maternal grandfather Elmer Palmer. Mansfield had the house painted pink, with cupids surrounded by pink fluorescent lights, pink furs in the bathrooms, a pink heart-shaped bathtub, and a fountain spurting pink champagne, and then dubbed it the "Pink Palace". It was, according to her, a "pink landmark". Hargitay, a plumber and carpenter before getting into bodybuilding, built a pink heart-shaped swimming pool. Mansfield decorated the Pink Palace by writing to furniture and building suppliers requesting free samples. She received over $150,000 ($ in  dollars) in free merchandise, paying only $76,000 ($ in  dollars) for the mansion itself. It was still a large sum, when the average cost of a house at the time was under $7,500 ($ in  dollars).

The Pink Palace was sold after her death and its subsequent owners have included Ringo Starr and Engelbert Humperdinck. In 2002, Humperdinck sold it to developers, and the house was demolished in November of that year.

Citations

References
 
 

Pink Palace
History of Los Angeles
Culture of Los Angeles
Jayne Mansfield
Demolished buildings and structures in Los Angeles
Buildings and structures demolished in 2002